Aimia is an investment holding company with a focus on long-term investments in public and private companies, on a global basis, through controlling or minority stakes, and is based in Montreal, Quebec, Canada. It is publicly listed on the Toronto Stock Exchange.

The company was founded in 1984. It operates a number of businesses, including the Aeroplan loyalty program, which is one of the largest loyalty programs in Canada. The company also provides data analytics services and consulting to clients in a range of industries, including financial services, retail, and travel.

Aimia has a global presence, with operations in North America, Europe, and Asia. The company is listed on the Toronto Stock Exchange and is a publicly traded company.

History 
Aimia (then Group Aeroplan Inc) was incorporated on May 5, 2008, succeeding Aeroplan Income Fund which was incorporated in 2005. From October 5, 2011, it conducted business under the Aimia brand name and on May 4, 2012, formally changed its name to Aimia Inc.

Business structure 

The company operates an investment advisory business through its wholly owned subsidiary Mittleman Investment Management, LLC, and owns a diversified portfolio of valuable investments.

General development of the business 
2005: Aeroplan completes its IPO as an income trust.

2007: LMG acquisition includes Nectar and LMG's Insight and Communication (I&C) business. Air Miles Middle East is also acquired.

2008: Aeroplan becomes Groupe Aeroplan.

2009: Carlson Marketing is acquired.

2010: Groupe Aeroplan launches Nectar Italia and invests in Club Premier.

September 2011: Acquisition of minority equity position in Cardlytics.

October 2011: Groupe Aeroplan becomes Aimia.

September 2012: Aimia and Sainsbury's form Insights 2 Communication LLP ("i2c"), a joint venture which offers suppliers multi-channel marketing solutions in and around Sainsbury's stores and online.

September 2012: Aimia acquires EIM – Excellence in Motivation.

November 2012: Aimia and Points International Ltd., owner and operator of the loyalty platform Points.com, entered into a binding agreement to make a minority investment in China Rewards, a Shanghai-based retail coalition loyalty program start-up.

2013: Aimia acquires Smart Button and 100% of Nectar Italia. Aimia also invests in ChinaRewards and launches Axis Bank.

September 2013: Aimia entered into ten-year financial credit card agreements in Canada with TD and CIBC banks, effective from January 1, 2014.

February 2014: Aimia, AirAsia and Think Big Digital formed a partnership to grow the AirAsia BIG Loyalty Program.

April 2014: Aimia acquired a 25% stake in Travel Club (Spain), becoming a joint owner of Travel Club alongside Iberia, Repsol and Eroski.

August 2014: Aimia formed a partnership with Fractal Analytics, a provider of advanced analytics.

December 2014: Aimia acquired Zed Inc. Ltd., a provider of SaaS behavioural segmentation solutions and consulting services focused on store management, ecommerce, buying and merchandising, and product category management.

May 2017: Air Canada announced it plans to launch a new loyalty program to replace Aeroplan as its loyalty program in 2020.

January 2018: Sainsbury's announced that it had paid £60m for the acquisition of the shares of Aimia Inc's UK business, to include all assets, colleagues, systems and licences required for the full and independent operation of the Nectar loyalty programme in the UK.

July 2018: Air Canada, TD Bank, CIBC, and Visa make an offer to buy Aeroplan from Aimia.

August 2018: Aimia rejects the offer from Air Canada, TD Bank, CIBC, and Visa, and unveils 3 new airline partners to replace Air Canada: Porter Airlines, Air Transat and Flair Airlines.
On August 21, 2018, Aimia agreed to sell Aeroplan to Air Canada, TD Bank, CIBC and Visa.

November 2018: Aimia signs definitive agreement to sell Aeroplan to Air Canada, TD Bank, CIBC, and Visa for $450 million in cash.

January 2019: Aimia completes sale of Aeroplan to Air Canada

August 2019: Aimia sells slightly over 50% of its stake (1.5 million shares from 2.978 million shares) in Cardlytics for $60 million.

April 2020: Aimia announces a corporate transformation from a loyalty solutions business to an investment holding company

References

External links
 Aimia page on Toronto Stock Exchange website

 
Companies listed on the Toronto Stock Exchange